Star Academies (formerly Tauheedul Education Trust) is a multi-academy trust (MAT) that operates 28 free schools and academies. There are nineteen secondary schools and nine primary schools under the jurisdiction of the trust.

As a multi-academy trust, Star Academies is an exempt charity regulated by the Department for Education.

Schools

Primary schools

Barkerend Primary Leadership Academy, Bradford
High Crags Primary Leadership Academy, Shipley
The Olive School, Birmingham
The Olive School, Blackburn
The Olive School, Bolton
The Olive School, Hackney
The Olive School, Preston
The Olive School, Small Heath
Thornbury Primary Leadership Academy, Bradford

Secondary schools

Bay Leadership Academy, Heysham
Eden Boys' Leadership Academy, Birmingham East
Eden Boys' Leadership Academy, Bradford
Eden Boys' Leadership Academy, Manchester
Eden Boys' School, Birmingham
Eden Boys' School, Bolton
Eden Boys' School, Preston
Eden Girls' Leadership Academy, Birmingham
Eden Girls' Leadership Academy, Manchester
Eden Girls' School, Coventry
Eden Girls' School, Slough
Eden Girls' School, Waltham Forest
Highfield Leadership Academy, Blackpool
Laisterdyke Leadership Academy, Bradford
Oulder Hill Leadership Academy, Rochdale
Small Heath Leadership Academy, Small Heath
Starbank School, Birmingham
Tauheedul Islam Boys' High School, Blackburn
Tauheedul Islam Girls' High School, Blackburn
The Valley Leadership Academy, Stacksteads
Tong Leadership Academy, Bradford

References

External links
 

 
Educational institutions established in 2010
2010 establishments in England